The Cisse is a river in France which flows into the Loire at Vouvray.

References

Rivers of France
Rivers of Centre-Val de Loire
Rivers of Indre-et-Loire